Listed below are the 2002 UCI Women's Teams that competed in 2002 women's road cycling events organized by the International Cycling Union (UCI).

Source:

References

2002
UCI